Alfred Hrdlicka (27 February 1928 – 5 December 2009) was an Austrian sculptor, painter, and professor. His surname is sometimes written Hrdlička.

He was born in Vienna. After learning to be a dental technician from 1943 to 1945, Hrdlicka studied painting until 1952 at the Akademie der bildenden Künste under Albert Paris Gütersloh and Josef Dobrowsky. Afterwards he studied sculpture until 1957 under Fritz Wotruba. In 1960 he had his first exhibition in Vienna; in 1964 he attained international attention as a representative of Austria at the Venice Biennale, Italy.

In 2008, his new religious work about the Apostles, Religion, Flesh and Power, attracted criticism about its homoerotic theme. The exhibition was housed in the museum of the St. Stephen's Cathedral of Vienna. He taught many sculptors, such as Hans Sailer, Angela Laich and others.

Works (selection)
Roll over Mondrian. Etching, 1967.
Friedrich Engels Monument  in Wuppertal, 1981.
Gegendenkmal at the Stephansplatz in Hamburg, 1985–86.
Mahnmal gegen Krieg und Faschismus (Memorial against War and Fascism) on the Albertinaplatz in Vienna. Sculpture, 1988–91.

Exhibitions (selection)
1960: Wiener-Kunsthalle, Zedlitzgasse, Vienna (with Fritz Martinz)
1962: Künstlerhaus, Französischer Saal, Vienna (with Fritz Martinz)
1963: Ausstellungspavillon Zwerglgarten, Salzburg (organized by Galerie Welz)
1964: 32. Biennale (Venice), with Herbert Boeckl
2008: Werkschau in der Kunsthalle Würth (Schwäbisch Hall)
2010: Belvedere (Wien): Alfred Hrdlicka. Unsparing!

Gallery

Literature
Wolfgang Kermer: Wiener Blut am Weissenhof: die Stuttgarter Jahre Alfred Hrdlickas. Mit zwei Texten von Alfred Hrdlicka. [Stuttgart]: [Staatliche Akademie der Bildenden Künste Stuttgart], 2008  
Alfred Weidinger: "Alfred Hrdlicka - Parallelwelten. Biografische Notizen 1928–1964." In: Alfred Hrdlicka - Schonungslos!. Bibliothek der Provinz, Weitra 2010, S. 13–56.
Bettina Secker: Alfred Hrdlicka-Neolithikum, Kindler, Munich, 1984

Notes 
Hrdlicka was a talented chess player. In 1953 Austria sent him to participate in the Student World Championship in Brussels.

References 

3. J. Weidenfels, "Hrdlicka, Sculptor, Citoyen", in: Art in Society, issue # 10  http://www.art-in-society.de/AS10/AH/Hrdlicka-1A.html

External links 

Monument against War and Fascism in Vienna Austria See a video of his most important monument in Vienna.
Alfred Hrdlicka at the aeiou Encyclopedia 
Galerie Ernst Hilger | Images of works of Hrdlicka 
Sculptures by Alfred Hrdlicka
Furor, debate over Jesus orgy drawing

1928 births
2009 deaths
Austrian male sculptors
20th-century Austrian painters
Austrian male painters
21st-century Austrian painters
21st-century male artists
Austrian people of Czech descent
Artists from Vienna
Academy of Fine Arts Vienna alumni
20th-century Austrian sculptors
20th-century Austrian male artists